Dr. Fox is an online clinic launched in January 2010 by Dr Tony Steele and Dan Broughton. The service is owned by Index Medical Ltd and was the first UK online consultation service to allow patients to check their eligibility for treatment without first completing a registration process.

The company was established to provide regulated online medical services through an online facility, where patients can undertake consultations for the supply of prescription medications across a limited range of medical conditions. The medication prescribed by Dr Fox does not include those that would require a face to face consultation, neither do they include any medicines that could be addictive or abused, such as painkillers.

This model of consultation falls under the jurisdiction of the Care Quality Commission, which regulates all private practitioners of medicine.

Regulation
The UK online pharmacy market has been subject to official regulation since the first legal online pharmacy was set up in 2002. In 2005 changes to the National Health Service regulation made it legal for online pharmacies to fill out NHS prescriptions over the internet. In general, online pharmacies in the UK are subject to the same statutory regulation that traditional pharmacies are under. Many have a Care Quality Commission registration number. They comply with the Health and Social Care Act 2008 and GPhC regulations. In 2008 the RPSGB introduced a specially designed green cross logo so that customers could easily identify online pharmacies that had been accredited by the organisation. In 2010 this logo scheme was passed on to the GPhC.

References

Pharmacies of the United Kingdom
Retail companies established in 2010
2010 establishments in England
Companies based in Bristol
Online retailers of the United Kingdom
Online pharmacies